The Thomas Stone Barn is located in Bareveld, Wisconsin.

History

Walter Thomas was a Welsh immigrant. The barn was originally used for keeping livestock and hay. Eventually, it was converted for dairying. It was added to the State Register of Historic Places in 2000 and to the National Register of Historic Places the following year.

References

Barns on the National Register of Historic Places in Wisconsin
National Register of Historic Places in Iowa County, Wisconsin
Dairy buildings in the United States
Limestone buildings in the United States
Buildings and structures completed in 1881